Kick 'Em When They're Down is a studio album by the band Znowhite.

Track listing 

 Live for the Weekend 
 All Hail to Thee     
 Run Like the Wind   
 Too Late           
Turn Up the Pain

Personnel
 Ian Tafoya - Guitars, Bass	
 Sparks Tafoya	- Drums
 Nicole Lee - Vocals

References

1985 EPs
Znowhite EPs
Roadrunner Records EPs